Live Twice is Darius Danesh's second and final album released on 25 October 2004. It did not do as well as his previous album, Dive In, charting at number 36 in the UK albums chart. He wrote 12 songs on the album; the only song he does not have a writing credit for is Save Me. Stephen Lipson was executive producer and Darius himself produced the track Secret Song.

Content
The first single released from the album was Kinda Love on 18 October 2004. It peaked at number 8 on the UK singles chart. The second and final single from the album was the title track, Live Twice, released on 10 January 2005. It reached number 7 on the UK Singles Chart, making it his fifth single to reach the UK top 10.

The last song on the album, Secret Song, is a hidden track as it is included at the end of the song Devil in You after a 3-minute silence between the songs. Secret Song was written and produced by Darius.

Track listing
"Kinda Love"
"Live Twice"
"How Do You Like It?"
"Better Man"
"Resolution"
"Stars Crash Down"
"Save Me"
"If I Could"
"Only You"
"Love to Love"
"Journey's End"
"Devil in You"
"Secret Song"

Darius Campbell albums
2004 albums
Albums produced by Stephen Lipson
19 Recordings albums
Mercury Records albums